Perttu Piilo (born 11 December 1975) is a Finnish male curler and curling coach.

He started curling in 1990 when he was 15 years old.

Teams

Men's

Mixed

Mixed doubles

Record as a coach of national teams

References

External links
 

Living people
1975 births
Finnish male curlers
Finnish curling champions
Finnish curling coaches
21st-century Finnish people